WPSU may refer to:

 WPSU-TV, a PBS member television broadcast station in State College, Pennsylvania (channel 3, DTV 15)
 WPSU (FM), an NPR member FM radio station in State College, Pennsylvania (91.5 MHz)
 Women's Social and Political Union, a militant organisation campaigning for women's suffrage in the United Kingdom, 1903–17